A list of all of the Roman dictators and magistri equitum known from ancient sources.  In some cases the names or dates have been inferred by modern historians.

Key to Latin terms and phrases
Roman dictators were usually appointed for a specific purpose, or causa, which limited the scope of their activities.  The chief causae were rei gerundae (a general purpose, usually to lead an army in the field against a particular enemy), clavi figendi (an important religious rite involving the driving of a nail into the wall of the Temple of Jupiter Optimus Maximus), and comitiorum habendorum (the holding of the comitia to elect magistrates, when the consuls were unable to do so).

Other causae included ludorum faciendorum, holding the Ludi Romani (Roman games), an important religious festival; ferarium constituendarum (establishing a religious festival in response to serious prodigies); seditionis sedandae (quelling sedition); and in one remarkable case, senatus legendi (filling up the ranks of the Senate after the Battle of Cannae).

The causa given at the very end of the Republic for the dictatorships of Sulla and Caesar are completely novel, as the powers granted greatly exceeded those traditionally accorded a Roman dictator.  By legibus faciendis et rei publicae constituendae causa, Sulla was empowered to rewrite the laws and revise the constitution of the Roman state; by dictator perpetuo rei publicae constituendae causa, Caesar was appointed dictator in perpetuity, and given the power to revise the constitution.

The various causae may not have been legally distinguished from one another prior to 368 BC, when Publius Manlius Capitolinus was appointed dictator seditionis sedandae et rei gerundae causa.  The precise formula of each causa later reported by ancient historians may only date to Manlius' dictatorship, in which case the causae attributed to earlier dictators must be later additions.

Other phrases
abdicavit – abdicated, or resigned.
mortuus est – died in office.
non iniit – not inaugurated.
occisus est – killed, slain.
sine magistro equitum – without a magister equitum.

Roman numerals given following a name indicate that the dictator or magister equitum for that year previously held the same magistracy.  The causae listed in the table are based largely on T. R. S. Broughton's The Magistrates of the Roman Republic, reporting those given in ancient sources.  For cases in which no causa is given, rei gerundae may usually be inferred.

List of dictators and magistri equitum

6th and 5th centuries BC

4th century BC

3rd century BC

1st century BC

See also
Constitution of the Roman Republic
Dictator

Footnotes

References

Bibliography
 Dictionary of Greek and Roman Biography and Mythology, William Smith, ed., Little, Brown and Company, Boston (1849).
 Marianne Elizabeth Hartfield, The Roman Dictatorship: its Character and Evolution (Ph.D. dissertation), University of California, Berkeley (1981).
 T. Robert S. Broughton, The Magistrates of the Roman Republic, American Philological Association (1952).
 John Pinsent, Military Tribunes and Plebeian Consuls: The Fasti from 444 V to 342 V, Steiner, Wiesbaden (1975).

People of the Roman Republic
Government of the Roman Republic
 
Dictator